The Boca is a left tributary of the river Siret in Romania. It flows into the Siret near Miclăușeni.

References

Rivers of Romania
Rivers of Iași County